Merb is a model-view framework for the Ruby programming language.

Merb, MERB, or variant may also refer to:

 MER-B, the Opportunity Mars rover
 Merbs, a fictional race from Storm Hawks, see List of Storm Hawks characters
 MerB, a bacterial gene that enocdes Mercury(II) reductase